Salisbury is a city in Wiltshire, England.

Salisbury may also refer to:

Places

Australia
 Salisbury, New South Wales, a village about 28 km north west of Dungog
 Salisbury, Queensland, a suburb in the City of Brisbane
 Salisbury railway station, Brisbane
 Salisbury, South Australia
City of Salisbury, South Australia
 Salisbury railway station, Adelaide

 Salisbury Highway, a main road in Adelaide

Salisbury, Victoria, a crossing loop on the Melbourne–Adelaide railway

Canada
 Salisbury, New Brunswick
 Salisbury Parish, New Brunswick
 Salisbury Island (Nunavut)
 Salisbury Composite High School, Sherwood Park, Alberta

United Kingdom
 Salisbury Cathedral
 Salisbury District, Wiltshire
 Diocese of Salisbury
 Salisbury Racecourse
 Salisbury Plain
 Salisbury Dock
 The Salisbury, a pub in Harringay, London
 The Salisbury, Covent Garden, a pub in Covent Garden, London
 Salisbury Crags, in Holyrood Park, Scotland
 Salisbury (UK Parliament constituency)

United States

 Salisbury Sound, Alaska
 Salisbury, Connecticut
 Salisbury School
 Salisbury, Maryland
 Salisbury University
 Salisbury, Massachusetts, a New England town
 Salisbury (CDP), Massachusetts, the urban portion of the town
 Salisbury, Missouri
 Salisbury, New Hampshire
 Salisbury, Herkimer County, New York
 Salisbury, Nassau County, New York
 Iona Island (New York), once known as Salisbury Island
 Salisbury, North Carolina
 Salisbury District, North Carolina, an historic legislative and military district in the United States, circa 1766
 Salisbury, Pennsylvania
 Salisbury, Vermont
 Salisbury (Chesterfield County, Virginia), a former 18th century plantation and house once home to Confederate General Edward Johnson
 Salisbury Township (disambiguation)

Elsewhere
 Harare, formerly Salisbury, the capital of Zimbabwe (formerly Rhodesia)
 Salisbury Island (Russia), also transcribed as Solsberi Island
 Salisbury, Dominica, a small town in Dominica
 Salisbury Road, Hong Kong

People

Peerages
 Earl of Salisbury, created five times since 1145
 Marquess of Salisbury, created in 1789, seven holders since
 Robert Gascoyne-Cecil, 3rd Marquess of Salisbury, British prime minister in late 19th century

Given name
 Salisbury Adams (1925–2004), American lawyer and politician

Surname
 Abigail Salisbury, Pennsylvania politician
 Benjamin Salisbury (born 1980), American actor
 Chad Salisbury (born 1976), quarterback for the Grand Rapids Rampage
 Cheryl Salisbury (born 1974), Australia football player
 Edward James Salisbury (1886–1978), director of the Royal Botanic Gardens at Kew
 Enoch Salisbury (1819–1890), Welsh barrister, author and politician
 Frank O. Salisbury (1874–1962), artist
 George Salisbury (disambiguation)
 Harrison Salisbury (1908–1993), American journalist who was the first regular New York Times correspondent in Moscow after World War II
 Harry Salisbury (1855–1933), Major League Baseball pitcher
 Ian Salisbury (born 1970), English cricketer
 James Salisbury (1823–1905), inventor of the Salisbury steak
 Joe Salisbury, British tennis player
 John of Salisbury (c. 1120–1180), English author, diplomat and bishop of Chartres
 Joyce E. Salisbury, American historian
 Ken Salisbury (born 1953), English/Australian boxer
 Mary Salisbury (1917–2008), English Labour politician 
 Matt Salisbury, English cricketer
 Mike Salisbury (born 1942), British television producer of nature documentaries
 Peter Salisbury (born 1971), drummer of The Verve
 Richard Anthony Salisbury (1761–1829), British botanist
 Richard Frank Salisbury (1926–1989), Canadian anthropologist
 Rollin D. Salisbury (1858–1922), American geologist
 Sally Salisbury or Sarah Pridden (c. 1692–1724), prostitute
 Sean Salisbury (born 1963), former NFL and CFL quarterback
 Suzanne Salisbury, American politician

Other uses
 HMS Salisbury, various Royal Navy ships
 Salisbury (album), a 1971 album by Uriah Heep
 Salisbury RFC, a rugby union club in Salisbury, Wiltshire
 Salisbury station (disambiguation), stations of the name
 Salisbury steak, ground beef shaped to resemble a steak
 Salisbury Garden, an exhibition garden in Kowloon, Hong Kong
 , an Ellerman Lines ship

See also
 Solsbury Hill
 Solsberry, Indiana
 Salsburgh, North Lanarkshire, Scotland
 Salesbury (disambiguation)
 Salusbury (disambiguation)
 Sainsbury (disambiguation)

 Salisbury Convention, a constitutional convention in the United Kingdom
 Salisbury Review, a British conservative magazine